State of Survival may refer to:
State of Survival (album), an album by Flipsyde
State of Survival (video game), a video game by FunPlus